Gullette is a surname. Notable people with the surname include:

Margaret Morganroth Gullette (born 1941), American cultural critic
Sean Gullette (born 1968), American film director, writer, screenwriter, actor, and producer